Norfolk County Cricket Club is one of twenty minor county cricket clubs within the domestic cricket structure of England and Wales. It represents the historic county of Norfolk.

The team is currently a member of the Minor Counties Championship Eastern Division and plays in the Championship, the MCCA Knockout Trophy and, from 2018, in the MCCA T20 competition. Norfolk took part in limited overs competitions which included first-class counties between 1965 and 2004. The club's main home venue is Manor Park, Horsford to the north of Norwich, although it has used other locations throughout the county.

History
Cricket may have reached Norfolk by the end of the 17th century.  The earliest reference to cricket in the county is dated 1745. The first county match played by the team was Norfolk v Suffolk at Bury St Edmunds Race Course on Thursday 23 August 1764, which was won by Norfolk.  This was reported in the Gazetteer & London Daily Advertiser on Tuesday 28 August.  More games against Suffolk followed.

A number of teams representing the county existed in the 18th and 19th centuries. The present club was founded on 14 October 1876 and played its first matches in 1877. The county joined the Minor Counties Championship when it was formed in 1895. It missed the 1896 season, and also did not compete in 1902 and 1903, but otherwise has remained at that level ever since.

Honours
Norfolk has won the Minor Counties Championship five times, two of them shared. It won the first Championship in 1895, sharing with Durham and Worcestershire. It won outright in 1905, 1910 and 1913. Its most recent success was a shared title with Herefordshire in 2002. Norfolk has won the MCCA Knockout Trophy a record five times since its inception in 1983, winning in 1986, 1997, 2001, 2005 and 2009.

First XI honours
 Minor Counties Championship (3) - 1905, 1910, 1913; shared (2) - 1895, 2002
 MCCA Knockout Trophy (5) - 1986, 1997, 2001, 2005, 2009

Grounds

Norfolk's main ground since 2001 has been Manor Park, Horsford on the northern fringes of Norwich. Prior to this the County Ground, Lakenham close to the centre of the city had been used. This was redeveloped for housing in the early 21st century and the cricket pitch and historic pavilion destroyed. The club has played home matches on nine other grounds within the county.

Notable players

Players who represented Norfolk and who have subsequently gone on to play over 100  first-class matches or Test cricket include:
 Bill Edrich – 39 Tests for England between 1938 and 1954–5
 John Edrich – 77 Tests and seven ODIs for England between 1963 and 1976
 Geoff Edrich – 339 first-class appearances for Lancashire between 1946 and 1958
 Michael Barton – Surrey captain from 1949 to 1951. 147 first-class matches played.
 Peter Parfitt – 37 Tests for England between 1961 and 1972
 Clive Radley – eight Tests and four ODIs for England in 1978. 559 first-class matches played.
 Martin Saggers – three Tests for England in 2003–04. 119 first-class matches played.

Former Test Match Special commentator Henry Blofeld played one List A match and 44 times in minor counties competitions for Norfolk between 1956 and 1965.

See also
Norfolk Women cricket team
List of Norfolk County Cricket Club grounds

References

External sources
 Norfolk County Cricket Club

 
National Counties cricket
History of Norfolk
Cricket in Norfolk
Cricket clubs established in 1876
1876 establishments in England